Petre Nuță (born 2 July 1928, date of death unknown) was a Romanian cyclist. He competed in the individual and team road race events at the 1952 Summer Olympics.

References

External links
 

1928 births
Year of death missing
Romanian male cyclists
Olympic cyclists of Romania
Cyclists at the 1952 Summer Olympics